Jalaluddin Airport , formerly known as Tolotio Airport, is an airport in Gorontalo Regency, Gorontalo, Indonesia .  It is located 30 km west of Gorontalo's city center. It is operated by Ministry of Transportation. The new terminal, which has 2 aerobridges, was opened on 1 May 2016. This airport is the alternative gateway for flights to the northern part of Indonesia. The airport is named after Djalaluddin Tantu, a colonel of the Indonesian Air Force from Gorontalo, who died during the Indonesia-Malaysia Confrontation in Malaysia when his C-130 Hercules was shot down.

History
The first aircraft to ever land at Gorontalo was a Grumman HU-16 Albatross in 1955. At that time, for the purposes of military transportation in uniting and defending the territory of Indonesia, a small airfield was built in Tolotio. Along with the completion of the airfield construction in 1956, a Douglas DC-3  landed at Tolotio Airport for the first time. With a simple facility, Tolotio Airport was planned to serve as a military airbase for the Indonesian Air Force and also as a commercial airport managed by the Directorate General of Civil Aviation. In 1974, the airport was renamed to Djalaluddin Airport after fallen Indonesian air force pilot,  Djalaluddin Tantu, based on the proposal of the Armed Forces faction in the parliament of Gorontalo Regency.

New terminal
The new terminal of Djalaluddin Airport in Gorontalo has been completed making it one of several first class airports in Eastern Indonesia besides Sam Ratulangi International Airport and Sultan Hasanuddin International Airport. The Ministry of Transportation has finished developing the air side and land side of Djalaluddin Airport, Isimu, Gorontalo. Air side development is able to accommodate three similar planes of Boeing 737 Next Generation and MAX and two similar units of ATR. Djalaluddin Airport runway measures 2,500 meters x 45 meters and will be extended to 3,000 meters x 40 meters in 2019. The parking area of the airport which was originally only an area of 3,902 m2 for 150 cars has been increased to 46 411 m2 and can accommodate more than 1,000 cars.

The new terminal building, consisting of two floors with an area of almost 12.000m2, can accommodate 2,500 passengers and replaces the old terminal building which was only large enough for 250 passengers. The new terminal  building was built from 2013 to 2015 financed by APBN. The ground floor serves as a place to check in, drop off, baggage claim, as well as public and employee areas. The second floor serves as a waiting room, with public areas and employees. There are also mosques located downstairs and upstairs, lactation rooms, an escalator, lifts, toilets, and wheelchairs for passengers with illness or disability. Also there are two medium-sized lounges and spacious and a smoking room. Other facilities that have been prepared are x-ray as many as four units, three for passengers and one for freight. The old terminal will be used as a regular Hajj Embarkation.

Airlines and destinations

Passenger

Ground transportation

Bus
Perum DAMRI operates airport shuttle buses that serve several destination from Djalaluddin Airport.

Taxi or car rent

Various taxi and car rental services are provided by numerous service providers

Incidents
On August 6, 2013 Lion Air Flight 897 struck a cow during landing. The aircraft slipped sideway onto the grass. Among 117 people on board, no one was injured.

References

Airports in Sulawesi
Buildings and structures in Gorontalo (province)
Transport in Gorontalo (province)